Coleman County is a county located in the U.S. state of Texas. As of the 2020 census, its population was 7,684. The county seat is Coleman. The county was founded in 1858 and organized in 1864. It is named for Robert M. Coleman, a signer of the Texas Declaration of Independence and soldier at the Battle of San Jacinto.

History
Around 10,000 BC, indigenous peoples of the Americas were the first inhabitants. Later inhabitants included the Jumano, Lipan Apache, and Comanche.

In 1632, Father Salas led an expedition to the upper Colorado River. In 1650, Captains Hernán Martín and Diego del Castillo explored the western portion of the county to the Concho River, and returned with pearls.  Diego de Guadalajara followed the same path as Martín and Castillo in 1654. From 1683 to 1684, Juan Domínguez de Mendoza established a short-lived Quicuchabe mission.

In 1855, the county's oldest community, Trickham, was founded as a trading post for the ranching activities of John Chisum. Coleman County was formed from Brown and Travis Counties in 1858. The county is named for Robert M. Coleman, a signer of the Texas Declaration of Independence.

In 1861, Rich Coffey settled the communities of Leaday and Voss.

In 1876, the site was chosen for Coleman, the county seat.

The community of Santa Anna was established in 1879. It is named after the Santa Anna Mountains, which in turn, are named after Comanche Chief Santana.

In 1886, the Santa Fe Railway completed a spur to Coleman from nearby Coleman Junction (now San Angelo Junction).

In 1908, the county's first oil well came in near Trickham.

In 1914, the Santa Fe completed the Coleman Cutoff between Coleman, Lubbock, and Clovis.  This linked its California lines with the Texas Gulf Coast and put Coleman on the road's main line.  Coleman's distinctive brick-and-stucco Santa Fe depot was completed in 1915.

Oil was discovered north of Coleman on the J. P. Morris ranch in 1917.

The Coleman County Medical Center opened in 1923.

By 1925, tenant farmers comprised 63% of local agriculture.

In 1930, the Coleman County population peaked at 23,669.

The Coleman County oilfields produced over a million barrels in 1948.

In 2000, Wind Clean Corporation, harnessing energy from wind power, was founded.

Geography

Major highways
  U.S. Highway 67
  U.S. Highway 84
  U.S. Highway 283
  State Highway 153
  State Highway 206

Adjacent counties
 Callahan County (north)
 Brown County (east)
 McCulloch County (south)
 Concho County (southwest)
 Runnels County (west)
 Taylor County (northwest)

Demographics

Note: the US Census treats Hispanic/Latino as an ethnic category. This table excludes Latinos from the racial categories and assigns them to a separate category. Hispanics/Latinos can be of any race.

As of the census of 2000,  9,235 people, 3,889 households, and 2,609 families resided in the county.  The population density was 7 people per square mile (3/km2).  The 5,248 housing units averaged 4 per square mile (2/km2).  The racial makeup of the county was 88.53% White, 2.19% African American, 0.62% Native American, 0.22% Asian, 0.01% Pacific Islander, 6.53% from other races, and 1.91% from two or more races.  About 14% of the population was Hispanic or Latino of any race.

Of the 3,889 households, 27.20% had children under the age of 18 living with them, 53.80% were married couples living together, 9.30% had a female householder with no husband present, and 32.90% were not families; 30.20% of all households were made up of individuals, and 17.40% had someone living alone who was 65 years of age or older.  The average household size was 2.33, and the average family size was 2.88.

In the county, the population was distributed as 23.60% under the age of 18, 6.60% from 18 to 24, 22.70% from 25 to 44, 24.00% from 45 to 64, and 23.00% who were 65 years of age or older.  The median age was 43 years. For every 100 females, there were 92.20 males.  For every 100 females age 18 and over, there were 88.10 males.

Males had a median income of $25,993 versus $17,378 for females. The per capita income for the county was $14,911. About 15.50% of families and 19.90% of the population were below the poverty line, including 27.40% of those under age 18 and 14.90% of those age 65 or over.

Education
These school districts serve Coleman County:
 Bangs ISD (mostly in Brown County)
 Coleman ISD
 Cross Plains ISD (mostly in Callahan County; small portions in Eastland and Brown Counties)
 Panther Creek Consolidated ISD (small portion in Runnels County)
 Santa Anna ISD

Communities

Cities
 Coleman (county seat)
 Novice

Town
 Santa Anna

Unincorporated communities

 Burkett
 Goldsboro
 Gouldbusk
 Rockwood
 Talpa
 Valera
 Voss

Politics

See also

 Recorded Texas Historic Landmarks in Coleman County

References

External links
 Coleman County government's website
 Coleman County in Handbook of Texas Online at the University of Texas
 Historic Coleman County materials, hosted by the Portal to Texas History.

 
1864 establishments in Texas
Populated places established in 1864